Acanthoglossa is a genus of beetles belonging to the family Staphylinidae.

The species of this genus are found in South African Republic.

Species:

Acanthoglossa aequalis 
Acanthoglossa apicipennis 
Acanthoglossa brachycera 
Acanthoglossa brevicollis 
Acanthoglossa congoensis 
Acanthoglossa convexiceps 
Acanthoglossa crassa 
Acanthoglossa csikii 
Acanthoglossa densior 
Acanthoglossa deweti 
Acanthoglossa dundoensis 
Acanthoglossa eppelsheimi 
Acanthoglossa erythraeana 
Acanthoglossa fauveli 
Acanthoglossa gomyi 
Acanthoglossa hirta 
Acanthoglossa hirtella 
Acanthoglossa hova 
Acanthoglossa humilis 
Acanthoglossa ifana 
Acanthoglossa inaequalis 
Acanthoglossa intermixta 
Acanthoglossa katonae 
Acanthoglossa longiceps 
Acanthoglossa longipennis 
Acanthoglossa methneri 
Acanthoglossa nepalica 
Acanthoglossa orientis 
Acanthoglossa pennata 
Acanthoglossa peropaca 
Acanthoglossa pictipennis 
Acanthoglossa punica 
Acanthoglossa quadraticeps 
Acanthoglossa royi 
Acanthoglossa rufa 
Acanthoglossa rufonitida 
Acanthoglossa similis 
Acanthoglossa testaceipennis 
Acanthoglossa uluguruensis 
Acanthoglossa uniformis

References

Staphylinidae
Staphylinidae genera